The Human Sciences Research Council (HSRC) of South Africa is Africa's largest dedicated social science and humanities research agency and policy think tank. It primarily conducts large-scale, policy-relevant, social-scientific projects for public-sector users, for non governmental organisations and international development agencies in support of development nationally, in the Southern African Development Community (SADC) and in Africa. 
  
The HSRC also seeks to contribute to the research and development strategy of the HSRC's parent Department of Science and Technology, especially through its mission to focus on the contribution of science and technology to addressing poverty. 
 
The HSRC originates in the National Bureau of Education and Social Research (founded in 1929). In recent years the HSRC has undergone major restructuring, aligning its research activities and structures to South Africa's national development priorities: notably poverty reduction through economic development, skills enhancement, job creation, the elimination of discrimination and inequalities, and effective service delivery. In essence, the HSRC  is looking at the following broad dimensions of Poverty, Inequality and Inclusive Development under the following banners, which are:  
 Economic Inclusion: including growth, competitiveness, regional integration, infrastructure, technological innovation ICT, resources (natural, human, land), labour markets and spatial dynamics (urbanisation, agglomeration, density);  
 Social Development: including well-being (quality of life, security, social and spatial mobility, migration), human capabilities (education, skills, health, etc.), social relationships (race, class, gender, identity, etc.), social institutions and cohesion (family, community, etc.);  
 Governance and Decision-making: including political participation, democracy, trust-building, nurturing legitimacy in public structures, capacity-building in the state, enhancing leadership, distributing power, accountability, responsiveness, social movements, multi-level government and coordinated decision-making.

Organisation 
It currently comprises more than 200 researchers and 250 support staff in five different locations, across several multi-disciplinary research programmes, namely:   
 Africa Institute of South Africa (AISA)  
 BRICS Research Centre (BRC)  
 Centre for Science, Technology and Innovation Indicators (CeSTII)  
 Democracy, Governance and Service Delivery (DGSD)  
 Economic and Performance Development (EPD)  
 Education and Skills Development (ESD)  
 HIV/AIDS, STI's and TB (HAST)  
 Human and Social Development (HSD)  
 Population Health, Health Systems and Innovation (PHHSI)  
 Research Use and Impact Assessment (RIA)

The HSRC is a statutory body which was established in 1968; its current CEO is Prof. Crain Soudien. The HSRC's scholarly publisher, the HSRC Press, is South Africa's largest academic publisher focused on social sciences and humanities.

Rated and other notable current and former researchers 

 Leslie Bank, current Deputy Executive Director: EPD, Professor extraordinaire at Walter Sisulu University
 Adam Habib, former Executive Director: DGSD, current Vice Chancellor at University of the Witwatersrand
 Peter Jacobs, current Research Director: EPD, NRF-rated researcher
 Glenda Kruss van der Heever, current Director of CeSTII, NRF-rated researcher
 Thierry Luescher, current Research Director: ESD, NRF-rated researcher
 Musawenkosi Mabaso, current Chief Research Specialist: PHHSI, NRF-rated researcher
 Sylvester Maphosa, current Chief Research Specialist in AISA, NRF-rated researcher
 Sizulu Moyo, current Research Director: PHHSI, NRF-rated researcher
 Priscilla Reddy, current Deputy Executive Director: PHHSI, NRF-rated researcher
 Vijay Reddy, former Executive Director: ESD, current Distinguished Research Fellow
 Tamsen Rochat, current Chief Research Specialist: HSD, NRF-rated researcher
Olive Shisana, former CEO of the HSRC, Counsellor of the Order of the Baobab (Bronze)
Leickness Simbayi, current Deputy CEO of the HSRC, NRF-rated researcher
 Crain Soudien, Emeritus Professor in Education and African Studies, former Deputy Vice-chancellor: University of Cape Town, current CEO of the HSRC, NRF-rated researcher
 Sharlene Swartz, current Executive Director: ESD, NRF-rated researcher
 Ivan Turok, current Executive Director: EPD, son of South African politician Ben Turok, NRF-rated researcher
 Alastair van Heerden, Research Director: HSC, honorary associate professor at University of the Witwatersrand, NRF-rated researcher
 Heidi van Rooyen, current Executive Director: HSD, honorary professor at University of the Witwatersrand, NRF-rated researcher

See also
Department of Science and Technology (South Africa) 
National Research Foundation of South Africa
Economics Research South Africa

References

External links
HSRC website

Science and technology in South Africa
Research institutes in South Africa